Saw Khway was a queen consort of King Minkhaung I of Ava from 1400 to 1422. According to a stone inscription dedicated by her elder sister Queen Shin Saw, she was a granddaughter of King Swa Saw Ke of Ava.

References

Bibliography
 
 

Queens consort of Ava
14th-century Burmese women
15th-century Burmese women